cmath or CMath may stand for:

The cmath header file in C++, alias of math.h.
 (complex math) is a library for Python ( for example results in ) 
CMath, abbreviation of the chartered mathematician title offered by the Institute of Mathematics and its Applications.